This is Hawkwind, Do Not Panic is a 1984 live album by the English space rock group Hawkwind. The album consisted of two discs: an LP which was recorded during the group's 1980 Levitation tour; and a 12" EP recorded at their June 1984 appearance at the Stonehenge Free Festival.

The group's line-up had changed by their June 1984 appearance at the Stonehenge Free Festival, with guitarists Dave Brock, Huw Lloyd-Langton and saxophonist Nik Turner remaining, Harvey Bainbridge switching from bass to keyboards. They were joined by bassist Alan Davey and drummer Clive Deamer, although Danny Thompson Jr deputised for Deamer on the Stonehenge recording.

The group undertook a 13 date UK tour in November 1984 to promote this album, with support from Wildfire. The Sheffield University show on 27 November was recorded, and part released on Undisclosed Files Addendum (1995).

The tracks from disc 1 have been re-issued on the 2009 3CD re-issue of Levitation.

Track listing

Side 1 (33 RPM)
 "Psi Power" [listed as "Psy Power"] (Robert Calvert, Dave Brock) – 5:07
 "Levitation" (Brock) – 7:15
 "Psychosis" [unlisted] (Harvey Bainbridge) – 1:27"The Fifth Second of Forever" [listed as "Circles"] (Brock, Huw Lloyd-Langton) – 4:14
 "Space Chase" (Lloyd-Langton) – 3:19

Side 2 (33 RPM)
 "Death Trap" (Calvert, Brock) – 4:42
 "Angels of Death" (Brock) – 6:27
 "Shot Down in the Night" (Steve Swindells) – 7:07

Side 3 (45 RPM)
 "Stonehenge Decoded" (Brock, Bainbridge) – 8:20

Side 4 (45 RPM)
 "Watching the Grass Grow" (Nik Turner, Trev Thoms) – 3:40

Personnel
Hawkwind
Dave Brock – electric guitar, keyboards, vocals
Huw Lloyd Langton – guitar, vocals
Harvey Bainbridge – bass guitar, keyboards, vocals
Keith Hale – keyboards (sides 1 & 2)
Ginger Baker – drums (sides 1 & 2)
Nik Turner – saxophone, flute, vocals (sides 3 & 4)
Alan Davey – bass guitar, vocals (sides 3 & 4)
Danny Thompson Jr – drums (sides 3 & 4)

Notes
Side 1&2: Lewisham Odeon, 18 December 1980
Side 3&4: Stonehenge Free Festival, June 1984

Release history
Nov-1984: Flicknife Records, SHARP022, 12"33RPM & 12"45RPM, first 10000 copies came in gatefold cover, the next 5000 copies in single cover with poster, thereafter simply single cover.
Nov-1988: Flicknife Records, SHARP1422CD, UK CD  with Zones
May-1992: Anagram Records, CDMGRAM 54, CD UK
Jul-1994: Griffin Music, GCDHA163-2, CD USA
Jul-2000: Cleopatra Records, CLE08502, USA 2CD with Zones
Jul-2002: Anagram Records, CDMGRAM160, UK 2CD with Zones

References

Hawkwind live albums
1984 live albums